Larry Stephen Gould (born August 16, 1952) is a Canadian former professional ice hockey player who played two games in the National Hockey League (NHL) for the Vancouver Canucks, with most of his professional career being in the minor International Hockey League. Gould's brother, John Gould, also played hockey, and played over 500 games in the NHL.

Playing career
Gould started his professional career in 1972 with the Des Moines Capitols of the International Hockey League (IHL). He spent one season there before moving to the Seattle Totems of the Western Hockey League (WHL). His two games with the Canucks game in January 1974: his debut was against the California Golden Seals on January 11, and he played the next night against the New York Rangers before returning to the Totems for the rest of the season. His older brother John was a member of the Canucks at the time. The WHL folded in 1974 and Seattle joined the Central Hockey League, and Gould played one season there, followed by one with the Buffalo Norsemen of the North American Hockey League before returning to the IHL in 1976, joining the Port Huron Flags. He spent five seasons with Port Huron, and a final year in the IHL split between the Muskegon Mohawks and Flint Generals before retiring in 1982.

Career statistics

Regular season and playoffs

External links 

1952 births
Living people
Buffalo Norsemen players
Canadian ice hockey left wingers
Des Moines Capitols players
Flint Generals players
Hamilton Red Wings (OHA) players
Ice hockey people from Simcoe County
Muskegon Mohawks players
Niagara Falls Flyers players
Port Huron Flags players
Seattle Totems (CHL) players
Seattle Totems (WHL) players
Undrafted National Hockey League players
Vancouver Canucks players